Isabelle de Montolieu (1751–1832) was a Swiss novelist and translator. She wrote in and translated to the French language. Montolieu penned a few original novels and over 100 volumes of translations. She wrote the first French translation of Jane Austen's Sense and Sensibility (Raison et Sensibilité, ou Les Deux Manières d'Aimer) and Persuasion (La Famille Elliot, ou L'Ancienne Inclination). 

One of her translations to French, Johann David Wyss's German-language The Swiss Family Robinson (Le Robinson suisse, ou, Journal d'un père de famille, naufragé avec ses enfans), was adapted and expanded by her with original episodes more than once. Montolieu's French version is the literal source of still frequently reprinted English translations; for example William H. G. Kingston's 1879 version, one of the most popular in English over the years, is actually a translation of Montolieu's French adaptation. 

Her first novel, Caroline de Lichtfield, ou Mémoires d'une Famille Prussienne, was an influential instant best-seller in the 1780s and stayed in print until the mid-19th century.

Notes

External links
Sources
 
 
Works by Isabelle de Montolieu at Google Books
Caroline de Lichtfield, ou Mémoires d'une Famille Prussienne, text of novel. (French)
Les Châteaux Suisses, Anciennes Anecdotes et Chroniques, selections from the 1824 text. (French)
Other
Biography, by Ellen Moody
Bibliography, by Ellen Moody

1751 births
1832 deaths
Swiss women writers
Swiss translators
Translators to French